The 33rd Academy Awards, honoring the best in film for 1960, were held on April 17, 1961, hosted by Bob Hope at the Santa Monica Civic Auditorium in Santa Monica, California. This was the first ceremony to be aired on ABC television, which has aired the Academy Awards ever since (except between 1971 and 1975, when they were aired on NBC for the first time since the previous year).

Billy Wilder's The Apartment won Best Picture, the last black-and-white film to do so until Schindler's List and The Artist at the 66th and 84th Academy Awards, respectively.

Gary Cooper was selected by the Academy Board of Governors to receive an Academy Honorary Award "for his many memorable screen performances and the international recognition he, as an individual, has gained for the motion picture industry". Cooper was too ill to attend the ceremony, though his condition was not publicly disclosed; James Stewart, a close friend of Cooper, accepted the Oscar on his behalf. Stewart's emotional speech hinted that something was seriously wrong, and the following day newspapers ran the headline, "Gary Cooper has cancer". Cooper died less than four weeks later.

Rising star Hayley Mills was selected by the Academy Board of Governors as the year's recipient of the Academy Juvenile Award for her breakthrough and acclaimed performance in Walt Disney's Pollyanna. She was the last recipient of the award; going forward, juvenile actors could officially compete in competitive categories. This was the first year a red carpet lined the walk into the theater.

Winners and nominees

Nominees were announced on February 27, 1961. Winners are listed first and highlighted with boldface.

Academy Honorary Awards
Gary Cooper "for his many memorable screen performances and the international recognition he, as an individual, has gained for the motion picture industry".
Stan Laurel "for his creative pioneering in the field of cinema comedy".

Academy Juvenile Award

Hayley Mills

Jean Hersholt Humanitarian Award
Sol Lesser

Presenters and performers

Presenters
Steve Allen and Jayne Meadows (Presenters: Best Song)
Polly Bergen and Richard Widmark (Presenters: Best Special Effects)
Yul Brynner (Presenter: Best Actress)
Kitty Carlisle and Moss Hart (Presenters: Writing Awards)
Cyd Charisse and Tony Martin (Presenters: Cinematography Awards)
Betty Comden and Adolph Green (Presenters: Best Film Editing)
Wendell Corey and Susan Strasberg (Presenters: Short Subjects Awards)
Tony Curtis and Janet Leigh (Presenters: Documentary Awards)
Bobby Darin and Sandra Dee (Presenters: Music Awards)
Greer Garson (Presenter: Best Actor)
Hugh Griffith (Presenter: Best Supporting Actress)
Audrey Hepburn (Presenter: Best Motion Picture)
Jim Hutton and Paula Prentiss (Presenters: Best Sound)
Eric Johnston (Presenter: Best Foreign Language Film)
Danny Kaye (Presenter: Honorary Award to Stan Laurel)
Gina Lollobrigida (Presenter: Best Director)
Tina Louise and Tony Randall (Presenters: Art Direction Awards)
Barbara Rush and Robert Stack (Presenters: Costume Design Awards)
Eva Marie Saint (Presenter: Best Supporting Actor)
Shirley Temple (Presenter: Juvenile Award to Hayley Mills)
William Wyler (Presenter: Honorary Award to Gary Cooper)

Performers
The Brothers Four ("The Green Leaves of Summer" from The Alamo)
Connie Francis ("Never on Sunday" from Never on Sunday)
The Hi-Lo's ("The Facts of Life" from The Facts of Life)
Jane Morgan ("The Second Time Around" from High Time)
Sarah Vaughan ("The Faraway Part of Town" from Pepe)

Multiple nominations and awards

These films had multiple nominations:

10 nominations: The Apartment
7 nominations: The Alamo, Pepe and Sons and Lovers
6 nominations: Spartacus
5 nominations: Elmer Gantry, The Facts of Life, Never on Sunday and The Sundowners
4 nominations: Inherit the Wind, Psycho and Sunrise at Campobello
3 nominations: Exodus
2 nominations: BUtterfield 8, Can-Can, Cimarron and The Virgin Spring

The following films received multiple awards.

5 wins: The Apartment
4 wins: Spartacus
3 wins: Elmer Gantry

See also 
18th Golden Globe Awards
1960 in film
 3rd Grammy Awards
 12th Primetime Emmy Awards
 13th Primetime Emmy Awards
 14th British Academy Film Awards
 15th Tony Awards

References

External links 
The 33rd Annual Academy Awards at IMDb
List of winners at Infoplease

Academy Awards ceremonies
1960 film awards
1960 awards in the United States
1961 in California
1961 in American cinema
April 1961 events in the United States
20th century in Santa Monica, California
Events in Santa Monica, California